Watkins (also called Box Elder) is an unincorporated town and a census-designated place (CDP) located in and governed by Arapahoe and Adams counties, Colorado, United States. The CDP is a part of the Denver–Aurora–Lakewood, CO Metropolitan Statistical Area. The town is surrounded by Aurora and its post office, which lies within the Aurora city limits, has the ZIP Code 80137. At the United States Census 2010, the population of the Watkins CDP was 653, while the population of the 80137 ZIP Code Tabulation Area was 1,323 including adjacent communities.

History
The Watkins post office has been in operation since 1878. The community was named after L. A. Watkins, a cattleman. Long an unincorporated community, Watkins incorporated as a town on June 15, 2004. However, on November 7, 2006, the town voted to revert to being an unincorporated community by a margin of 308-184.

Watkins is involved in trying to build the First Park in Adams County, and the Watkins Historical Preservation Society is co-operating with the town on some historical buildings for installation in the park as well. Front Range Airport is located near Watkins.

Geography

Demographics

See also

Outline of Colorado
Index of Colorado-related articles
State of Colorado
Colorado cities and towns
Colorado census designated places
Colorado counties
Arapahoe County, Colorado
Adams County, Colorado
Colorado metropolitan areas
Front Range Urban Corridor
North Central Colorado Urban Area
Denver-Aurora-Boulder, CO Combined Statistical Area
Denver-Aurora-Broomfield, CO Metropolitan Statistical Area

References

External links

Watkins @ Colorado.com
Watkins @ UncoverColorado.com
Watkins on Adams County website
Watkins on Arapahoe County website
Watkins residents say "no" to city living 
Watkins' "U-turn" on incorporation

Census-designated places in Adams County, Colorado
Census-designated places in Arapahoe County, Colorado
Census-designated places in Colorado
Denver metropolitan area

Populated places established in 2004
Populated places disestablished in 2006
2004 establishments in Colorado
2006 disestablishments in Colorado
Former municipalities in Colorado